Heliophanus validus is a jumping spider species in the genus Heliophanus.  It was first described by Wanda Wesołowska in 1986 and lives in Kenya.

References

Endemic fauna of Kenya
Spiders described in 1986
Fauna of Kenya
Salticidae
Spiders of Africa
Taxa named by Wanda Wesołowska